Rynearson Stadium, nicknamed "The Factory", is a stadium in Ypsilanti, Michigan. It is primarily used for American football, and is the home field of the Eastern Michigan University Eagles. Currently, the stadium has seating for 30,200 people. Standing room is available in the south end zone, allowing for crowds larger than the listed capacity. The stadium is located on the school's west campus, just south of the Huron River.

History
The stadium held its first game on September 27, 1969, when EMU upset the University of Akron, 10–3. It originally consisted of two opposite sideline stands around the field and running track. It is one of only two stadiums in the MAC which shares its football field with a running track (UB Stadium being the other). The stadium was named for the late Elton J. Rynearson Sr., who coached football at Eastern Michigan for 26 seasons. His teams compiled a record of 114–58–15. In one six-year period, from 1925–30, Rynearson’s teams won 40 games, tied two, and lost just four.

The largest attendance for an EMU game at Rynearson Stadium was 26,188 (87% of capacity), on November 28, 2008, for a 56–52 win over Central Michigan.

Renovations
In 1992, the seats were expanded south from each grandstand but not connected, giving the stadium the look of an unfinished horseshoe. This was done to conform to the new Division I-A rules for minimum stadium size. Originally a grass field, the field has been artificial since 1991 and was upgraded to FieldTurf in 2005. More recently, the original FieldTurf was replaced prior to the 2014 season by a new gray FieldTurf surface. This made Rynearson Stadium only the third Division I FBS stadium with a non-traditional field color (after Albertsons Stadium at Boise State) and the sixth college football stadium overall with this feature. Lighting was added in 1974, partially due to the Detroit Wheels of the World Football League using the stadium as their home field. The stadium has also hosted high school football games.

See also
 List of NCAA Division I FBS football stadiums

References

External links

 Rynearson Stadium - EMUEagles.com
 Official Eastern Michigan University school website

World Football League venues
American football venues in Michigan
College football venues
Eastern Michigan Eagles football
Buildings at Eastern Michigan University
Eastern Michigan Eagles
Sports venues completed in 1969
1969 establishments in Michigan
College track and field venues in the United States
Sports venues in Washtenaw County, Michigan
Athletics (track and field) venues in Michigan